The 1965–66 season was Colchester United's 24th season in their history and their first back in the fourth tier of English football, the Fourth Division, following relegation the previous season. Alongside competing in the Fourth Division, the club also participated in the FA Cup and the League Cup.

Colchester were immediately promoted back to the Third Division after ending the season in fourth position. Queens Park Rangers handed Colchester another early FA Cup exit following a replay, while Middlesbrough knocked the U's out of the League Cup in the second round.

Season overview
Neil Franklin brought in forward Reg Stratton to lead the line for the new season and he responded with 18 league goals and 21 in total. They won ten times on their travels, setting a new club record, while losing just three times at Layer Road. After leading the Fourth Division table across Easter, subsequent defeats to promotion rivals Darlington on two occasions and Torquay United saw Colchester drop to fourth position ahead of the final game of the season. A 2–1 defeat to Newport County left fans awaiting the result of Luton Town's game with Chester with Luton just one point behind and the game kicking off 15-minutes later than the U's fixture. The game finished 1–1 with Colchester, Luton, and Tranmere Rovers all tied on 56 points. Goal average would separate the sides, with Franklin's side pipping Tranmere to the final promotion spot by 0.08.

As the club did four years prior, the U's bounced back from the Fourth Division at the first attempt. The season was also notable as player replacements were allowed for the first time. Ray Price became Colchester's first substitute when he came on to replace the injured Ted Phillips after 85-minutes of their 2–0 home win over Rochdale on 18 September.

Players

Transfers

In

 Total spending:  ~ £25/5s

Out

 Total incoming:  ~ £1,000

Match details

Fourth Division

Results round by round

League table

Matches

League Cup

FA Cup

Squad statistics

Appearances and goals

|-
!colspan="14"|Players who appeared for Colchester who left during the season

|}

Goalscorers

Clean sheets
Number of games goalkeepers kept a clean sheet.

Player debuts
Players making their first-team Colchester United debut in a fully competitive match.

See also
List of Colchester United F.C. seasons

References

General
Books

Websites

Specific

1965-66
English football clubs 1965–66 season